The Lac Otelnuk mine is Quebec's largest iron mine project with NI 43–101 compliant estimated reserves of 23.74 billion tonnes of ore grading 29.65% iron metal. 
In 2005 Bedford Resource Partners  staked 129 claims over the deposit and optioned it to Adriana Resources. In 2012, 60% ownership of the iron deposit was sold to Wuhnan Iron and Steel Co. (WISCO). More than $150 million in expenditures have been invested in the exploration, all studies, the 2015 NI 43-101 compliant feasibility study and the formation of the Lac Otelnuk mining Company between Adriana Resources Inc and WISCO.

In 2017, Baosteel merged with WISCO and Adriana Resources merged with Sprott Holdings. 

Further details can be obtained bycontacting Lac Otelnuk Mining LTD

See also 
 List of mines in Canada

References 

Iron mines in Canada